Bernardo Chavez Rico (born October 13, 1941 – December 3, 1999) was an American luthier specializing in guitars. Known as Bernie Rico Sr. or simply B.C., Rico was born in East Los Angeles, California. Working with his father, Rico began his career building Flamenco, Classical guitars, banjos, and ukuleles in the 1950s. Rico's original instruments were acoustic guitars made under the names Bernardo Rico or B.C. Rico, Not to be confused with the line of import guitars made in the late 1970s and early 1980s. These acoustic guitars are very rare, with about 300 surviving.

In 1967 the company name was changed to its present form, B.C. Rich. Also a motorcycle enthusiast, Rico's work on his motorcycle paint jobs inspired him to create unusual finishes for his guitars.

Rico and his company went on to create several models of guitars and the company prospered.

In the late 1980s to the early 1990s, Rico licensed B.C. Rich to New Jersey-based Class Axe. During this time Rico produced handmade Mason Bernard guitars. About 300 solid-body guitars were produced with at least one acoustic produced. In 1993, Rico returned to B.C. Rich to produce handmade guitars.

References

1941 births
1999 deaths
American luthiers
Guitar makers